Megachile semicognata is a species of bee in the family Megachilidae. It was described by Theodore Dru Alison Cockerell in 1937.

References

Semicognata
Insects described in 1937